Seebert is an unincorporated community in Pocahontas County, West Virginia, United States.

The community most likely was named after the local Seebert family.

References

Unincorporated communities in Pocahontas County, West Virginia
Unincorporated communities in West Virginia